Isobel Hannen (born 17 December 1962 as Isobel Torrance Jr.) is a Scottish curler and curling coach.

She competed at the 1992 Winter Olympics when curling was a demonstration sport.

Personal life
Her mother Isobel Torrance is a former competitive curler,  and two-time Scottish women's champion. Hannen's daughter Rachel is also a competitive curler.

Teams

Record as a coach of national teams

References

External links

1962 births
Living people
Scottish female curlers
British female curlers
Olympic curlers of Great Britain
Curlers at the 1992 Winter Olympics
Scottish curling champions
Scottish curling coaches